For the results of the Namibia national football team, see:
Namibia national football team results (1990–2019)
Namibia national football team results (2020–present)